Trinway is an unincorporated community and census-designated place in northern Cass Township, Muskingum County, Ohio, United States, in the east-central part of the state. The village is 52 miles east of the state capital of Columbus and near the town of Dresden. Trinway is a rural community of mostly residential architecture.

History
The community was originally known as "Dresden Junction", as it was the point where the Cincinnati and Muskingum Valley Railroad met the Stuebenville and Indiana Railroad (which later became part of the Pittsburgh, Cincinnati, Chicago and St. Louis Railroad).  It was also the site of the first railroad station for the nearby village of Dresden.

Historic structures
There are several buildings of special historic interest in Trinway, including:
The old Trinway School (1878)
The Trinway Methodist Church (1868)
The Cochran House (1862)
The Prospect Place Mansion (1856)

Politics
Trinway is the location of the township hall for Cass Township.

Education
Students from Trinway attend the schools of the Tri-Valley Local School District.

Demographics

As of the census of 2010, there were 365 people, 138 households, and 91 families residing in the village. The racial makeup of Trinway was 97% White, 0.3% African American, 0.0% Native American, 0.0% Pacific Islander, 0.0% from other races, and 2.7% from two or more races. Hispanic or Latino of any race were 0.3% of the population.

There were 138 households, of which 33.3% had children under the age of 18 living with them, 50.7% were married couples living together, 10.9% had a female householder with no husband present, and 34.1% were non-families. 29.0% of all households were made up of individuals, and 26.1% had someone living alone who was 65 years of age or older. The average household size was 2.64 and the average family size was 3.24.

In the village the population was spread out, with 33.2% under the age of 19, 1.9% from 20 to 24, 32.1% from 25 to 44, 20.3% from 45 to 64, and 12.6% who were 65 years of age or older. The median age was 39 years. For every 100 females, there were 117 males. For every 100 females age 18 and over, there were 102 males.

References

External links
 Trinway, Ohio demographics

Unincorporated communities in Muskingum County, Ohio
Unincorporated communities in Ohio
Census-designated places in Ohio
Census-designated places in Muskingum County, Ohio